Ashley is a census-designated place in Pike County, Missouri, United States.   It is located on Route 161, approximately six miles south of Bowling Green.

Ashley was platted in 1836. The community was named for William Henry Ashley, who served as lieutenant governor in the 1820s. A post office called Ashley was established in 1835, and remained in operation until 1965.

Demographics

References

Census-designated places in Pike County, Missouri